Crispen is a given name. Notable people with the given name include:

Crispen Chakanyuka (1943–2002), Zimbabwean sculptor
Crispen Mutakanyi (born 1970), Zimbabwean middle-distance runner
Crispen Sachikonye (born 1969), Zimbabwean entrepreneur in the advertising industry

See also
Crispin and Crispinian
Crispin (given name)